

 Kurt Versock (14 February 1895 – 17 March 1963) was a German general who was awarded the Knight's Cross during World War II.

Versock joined the army in 1914, taking part in World War I. After the war he was retained in the Reichswehr and then served in the Wehrmacht. He took part in the Invasion of Poland in 1939 and Operation Barbarossa as front-line commander. In August 1942, he was awarded the Knight's Cross of the Iron Cross. In May 1943 he appointed commander of the 24th Infantry Division.

In September 1944, he was appointed commander of the XXXXIII Army Corps and tasked with the organization of the coastal defense of the Courland operation. In November 1944 he was promoted to General der Gebirgstruppe. In March 1945 the General Command of the XXXXIII Army Corps was evacuated over sea from the Courland Pocket and added to the 8th army in Northern Hungary. At the end of the war, Kurt Versock surrendered to the American forces.

Awards

 German Cross in Gold (20 June 1944)
 Knight's Cross of the Iron Cross on 25 August 1942 as Oberst and commander of the Infanterie-Regiment 31

References

Citations

Bibliography

 

Generals of Mountain Troops
People from Pirna
Recipients of the Gold German Cross
Recipients of the Knight's Cross of the Iron Cross
German prisoners of war in World War II held by the United States
1895 births
1963 deaths
People from the Kingdom of Saxony
Military personnel from Saxony
Recipients of the clasp to the Iron Cross, 1st class
Commanders of the Order of the Crown (Romania)
German Army personnel of World War I
German Army generals of World War II